Akbarabad (also Romanized as Akbarābād) is a village in Gol Gol Rural District, in the Central District of Kuhdasht County, Lorestan Province, Iran. At the 2006 census, its population was 820, in 159 families.

References 

Towns and villages in Kuhdasht County